HQ is the eighth studio album by English folk/rock singer-songwriter and guitarist Roy Harper. It was first released in 1975 by Harvest Records. In the United States the album was released under the title When An Old Cricketer Leaves The Crease, which is also the name of the LP's most popularly known track.

History 
Harper considered HQ to be "...probably the best record that I have made to date" and "...a great album made at one of the best times of my life" Originally the album was to be called Blood From a Stone, but it was changed to avoid unwanted comparisons with Dylan's Blood on the Tracks.

Songs 

"The Game" features David Gilmour and John Paul Jones, playing lead guitar and bass respectively.

The "scribble lark" referred to in "Forget Me Not" is an old country name for the yellowhammer.

"When an Old Cricketer Leaves the Crease", one of Harper's best-known songs, features the Grimethorpe Colliery Band, arranged by David Bedford. The song is about cricket and references contemporary players Geoffrey Boycott and John Snow, to whom it is dedicated.

Album cover
The album's artwork was created by Hipgnosis. Of the artwork Harper stated:

Awards
In 1975, HQ was awarded Record of the Year in Portugal, and received a similar award in Finland.

2012 reissue
In 2012 the album was digitally remixed and re-released in a 24-page case bound booklet with new pictures, prose, poetry and a new sleeve design.

Track listing
All tracks credited to Roy Harper.

Personnel
Roy Harper – vocals, acoustic guitar
Chris Spedding – electric guitar
Dave Cochran – bass guitar
Bill Bruford – drums, percussion

Additional Personnel
David Gilmour – electric guitar (on "The Game")
John Paul Jones – bass guitar (on "The Game")
Steve Broughton – drums, percussion (on "The Game")
The Grimethorpe Colliery Band, arranged by David Bedford – brass (on "When an Old Cricketer Leaves the Crease")

References

External links 
Roy Harper Official Site
Excellent Roy Harper resource

Roy Harper (singer) albums
1975 albums
Albums with cover art by Hipgnosis
Chrysalis Records albums
Harvest Records albums
Albums produced by Peter Jenner